Glycogen storage disease type III (GSD III) is an autosomal recessive metabolic disorder and inborn error of metabolism (specifically of carbohydrates) characterized by a deficiency in glycogen debranching enzymes.
It is also known as Cori's disease in honor of the 1947 Nobel laureates Carl Cori and Gerty Cori. Other names include Forbes disease in honor of clinician Gilbert Burnett Forbes (1915–2003), an American physician who further described the features of the disorder, or limit dextrinosis, due to the limit dextrin-like structures in cytosol. Limit dextrin is the remaining polymer produced after hydrolysis of glycogen. Without glycogen debranching enzymes to further convert these branched glycogen polymers to glucose, limit dextrinosis abnormally accumulates in the cytoplasm.

Glycogen is a molecule the body uses to store carbohydrate energy. Symptoms of GSD-III are caused by a deficiency of the enzyme amylo-1,6 glucosidase, or debrancher enzyme. This causes excess amounts of an abnormal glycogen to be deposited in the liver, muscles and, in some cases, the heart.

Signs and symptoms
Glycogen storage disease type III presents during infancy with hypoglycemia and failure to thrive.  Clinical examination usually reveals hepatomegaly.  Muscular disease, including hypotonia and cardiomyopathy, usually occurs later. The liver pathology typically regresses as the individual enter adolescence, as does splenomegaly, should the individual so develop it.

Genetics

In regards to genetics glycogen storage disease type III is inherited in an autosomal recessive pattern (which means both parents need be a carrier), and occurs in about 1 of every 100,000 live births.  The highest incidence of glycogen storage disease type III is in the Faroe Islands where it occurs in 1 out of every 3,600 births, probably due to a founder effect. There seem to be two mutations in exon 3 (c.17_18delAG) being one of them, which are linked to the subtype IIIb.

The amylo-alpha-1, 6-glucosidase, 4-alpha-glucanotransferase gene and mutations to it, are at the root of this condition. The gene is responsible for creating glycogen debranching enzyme, which in turn helps in glycogen decomposition.

Diagnosis
In terms of the diagnosis for glycogen storage disease type III, the following tests/exams are carried out to determine if the individual has the condition:
 Biopsy (muscle or liver)
 CBC
 Ultrasound
 DNA mutation analysis (helps ascertain GSD III subtype)

Differential diagnosis
The differential diagnosis of glycogen storage disease type III includes GSD I, GSD IX and GSD VI. This however does not mean other glycogen storage diseases should not be distinguished as well.

Classification

Clinical manifestations of glycogen storage disease type III are divided into four classes:
 GSD IIIa, is the most common, (along with GSD IIIb) and which clinically includes muscle and liver involvement
 GSD IIIb, which clinically has liver involvement but no muscle involvement
 GSD IIIc  which clinically affects liver and muscle.
 GSD IV affects liver only (not muscle)

Treatment

Treatment for glycogen storage disease type III may involve a high-protein diet, in order to facilitate gluconeogenesis. Additionally the individual may need:
 IV glucose (if oral route is inadvisable)
 Nutritional specialist
 Vitamin D (for osteoporosis/secondary complication)
 Hepatic transplant (if complication occurs)

References

Further reading

External links

 

Autosomal recessive disorders
Hepatology
Inborn errors of carbohydrate metabolism